Tiziano is an Italian masculine given name. The feminine form is Tiziana. Tiziano may refer to:

 St. Tiziano of Brescia, 5th century bishop of Brescia
 St. Tiziano of Oderzo, 7th century bishop of Oderzo
 Tiziano Aspetti (circa 1557–1606), Italian sculptor
 Tiziano Bruzzone (born 1984), Italian footballer
 Tiziano Dall'Antonia (born 1983), Italian professional road bicycle racer
 Tiziano Ferro (born 1980), Italian singer
 Tiziano Fratus (born 1975), Italian poet
 Tiziano Polenghi (born 1978), Italian footballer
 Tiziano Sclavi (born 1953), Italian comic book author
 Tiziano Terzani (1938–2004), Italian journalist
 Tiziano Vecelli (circa 1485–1576), Italian painter

Italian masculine given names